Eugene Henry Black III (born 1964) is a United States Navy vice admiral and career surface warfare officer who serves as the deputy chief of naval operations for operations, plans and strategy since October 7, 2022. He previously served as the 30th Commander of United States Sixth Fleet, deputy commander of United States Naval Forces Europe, deputy commander of United States Naval Forces Africa, and as the Joint Force Maritime Component Commander from June 2020 to September 2022.

Early life and education
A New Jersey native, Black is a 1986 graduate of the United States Naval Academy, where he earned a Bachelor of Science degree in Political Science. He later earned a Master of Science degree in Management from the Naval Postgraduate School in Monterey, California in March 1994.

Naval career
While in command, Leyte Gulf deployed to the Persian Gulf and North Arabian Sea. Black commanded  from May 2004 until January 2006, also deployed to the Persian Gulf.

Black's shore duty assignments include director, Surface Warfare Officer Distribution, Navy Personnel Command, Millington, Tennessee; Future Ships branch head, Surface Warfare Directorate (N86) on the staff of the Chief of Naval Operations; and Afghanistan/Pakistan Politico-Military Policy branch head, Joint Staff, Strategic Plans and Policy (J5), in Washington, D.C. Other assignments include Commander detailer, Navy Personnel Command and Surface Warfare Officer School department head instructor, Newport, Rhode Island.

For his first flag officer assignment, he served as deputy commander, United States Naval Forces Central Command/United States Fifth Fleet, Manama, Bahrain from June 2015 until July 2017. Following this assignment, he commanded Carrier Strike Group Eight from September 2017 to April 2019. He served as the director, Surface Warfare Division, N96, Office of the Chief of Naval Operations in Washington, D.C. from May 2019 to May 2020.

Black assumed duties as commander of United States Sixth Fleet, deputy commander of United States Naval Forces Europe and United States Naval Forces Africa, and as Joint Force Maritime Component Commander in June 2020, and served in this position until September 2022.

In April 2022, Black was nominated for appointment as deputy chief of naval operations for operations, plans, and strategy.

References

Date of birth missing (living people)
1964 births
Living people
United States Naval Academy alumni
Military personnel from New Jersey
United States Navy officers
Naval Postgraduate School alumni
Recipients of the Legion of Merit
United States Navy admirals